Planets Under Attack is a strategy video game inspired by Galcon and developed by Targem Games.

Gameplay 

Planets Under Attack is a strategy adventure game. The player controls a space fleet with the goal to conquer levels and to complete missions in the fight for dominance in multiple planetary systems. Each level provides a diversity of goals, modes and difficulty levels. The player can conquer an entire planet system before an infested planet hatches aliens, or conquer a planet and hold off all comers. Each mission offers three levels of difficulty, with each level unlocking additional challenges.The game mechanics are packed into missions like rotating asteroid belts, changing star constellations and varied objectives. By using tactics to complete objectives, the player will carve out a niche in the galaxy and level up to new ranks. A technology tree enables the player to strategically adapt to the game’s increasing difficulty. The right combination of technologies is often the difference between victory and defeat. Technologies affect planetary defense, ship performance, and other boosts.

In addition to the single player campaign and skirmish modes, the game offers an online multiplayer mode with live battles. There are different game modes, Team Multiplayer, Elimination, Capture, King of the Hill, and Domination, two playable races, and different team constellations, Skirmish and Multiplayer. There are unlockable ranks, avatars and rewards.

Reception 
The French magazine Joystick rated the game 13/20, criticizing the game for its repetitiveness but praising its gameplay and intuitiveness.

References 

2012 video games
Strategy video games
Video games developed in Russia
Windows games
MacOS games
Xbox 360 Live Arcade games
PlayStation 3 games
PlayStation Network games
TopWare Interactive games
Multiplayer and single-player video games
Targem Games games